Tawang Chu is the main river of the Tawang district in Arunachal Pradesh, India. The entire district may be regarded as the basin of the Tawang Chu river. In addition, two south-flowing rivers from Tibet, viz., Tsona Chu and  Nyamjang Chu, join the river within the district. The combined river flows west into Bhutan, where it progresses to the Manas River and flows into the Assam state of India.

Tawang Chu is formed by the joining of three rivers originating within the Tawang district: Goshu Chu, Dungma Chu and Gorjo Chu. These rivers merge near the village of Mago, after which the combined river is called Mago Chu. The river flows west towards Bhutan, passing by the Tawang town on its southern flank.
Near Lumla, the Nyamjang Chu river originating in Tibet joins Tawang Chu. 

Tawang Chu enters Bhutan after passing the Dudunghar Circle of the Tawang district. At Duksum, the river merges with the Kholong Chu river flowing from the north. The combined river is called Drangme Chhu (or Manas River).

References

Bibliography

External links 
 The course of Tawang Chu marked on OpenStreetMap

Rivers of Arunachal Pradesh
Rivers of Bhutan
Shannan, Tibet
Tawang district